Aries Tuansyah (born January 1, 1984) is an Indonesian football defender who currently plays as a center back for Semen Padang. He represented the club during the 2013 AFC Cup.

Honours

Club honours
Persibo Bojonegoro
Liga Indonesia First Division (1): 2007
Piala Indonesia (1): 2012
Semen Padang
Indonesian Community Shield (1): 2013

References

External links

1984 births
Indonesian footballers
Living people
Semen Padang F.C. players
Indonesia international footballers
People from Bojonegoro Regency
Liga 1 (Indonesia) players
Indonesian Premier League players
Association football central defenders
Sportspeople from East Java